The Cross and the Switchblade is a biographical book written by the Rev. David Wilkerson with John and Elizabeth Sherrill, published by Bernard Geis Associates in 1963.

Summary 
In 1958, Pentecostal pastor David Wilkerson of Assemblies of God is touched by an article in Life about seven teenagers who are members of a criminal gang. Alone and with little money, he goes to Brooklyn, sometimes at the risk of his life, to talk about Jesus with members of street gangs. There, Wilkerson met Nicky Cruz, a member of the "Mau Maus" street gang.

Reception 
The book became a bestseller, with more than 15 million copies distributed in over 30 languages.

Adaptations 
In 1970, a film adaptation was released, starring Pat Boone as David Wilkerson and Erik Estrada (in his screen debut) as Nicky Cruz, the teen gang member whose life was transformed by Wilkerson's ministry.

See also
Jackie Pullinger

References

External links

Books about Christianity
Gangs in New York City
Non-fiction crime books
1962 non-fiction books
Collaborative non-fiction books
Non-fiction books adapted into films